Panzanella  or panmolle  is a Tuscan and Umbrian chopped salad of soaked stale bread, onions and tomatoes that is popular in the summer. It often includes cucumbers, sometimes basil and is dressed with olive oil and vinegar.

It is also popular in other parts of central Italy.

History
The 16th-century artist and poet Bronzino sings the praises of onions with oil and vinegar served with toast and, a page later, speaks of a salad of onions, purslane, and cucumbers.  This is often interpreted as a description of panzanella.

The name is believed to be a portmanteau of "pane", Italian for bread, and "zanella", a deep plate in which it is served.

Ingredients

Panzanella was based on onions, not tomatoes, until the 20th century.

Modern panzanella is generally made of stale bread soaked in water and squeezed dry, red onions, tomatoes, olive oil, vinegar, salt, and pepper.  Cucumbers and basil are often added.

Other ingredients—lettuce, olives, mozzarella, white wine, capers, anchovies, celery, carrots, red wine, tuna, parsley, boiled eggs, mint, bell peppers, lemon juice, and garlic—are sometimes used, but Florentine traditionalists disapprove of them.

See also
 Fattoush, a Levantine bread salad
 List of bread dishes
 List of Italian dishes
 List of salads

References

Further reading
 

Cuisine of Tuscany
Bread salads